Leo Ignatius Higdon, Jr. is an academic administrator and former Wall Street executive. He was previously president of Connecticut College (July 1, 2006, until his retirement on Dec. 31, 2013), the College of Charleston (from October 2001 to June 2006) and Babson College.

From 1968 until 1970, he and his wife served for two years as Peace Corps volunteers in Malawi. In 1972, he received an M.B.A. in finance from the University of Chicago.

Beginning in 1973, Higdon worked for the investment banking company Salomon Brothers. He eventually became vice chairman and head of the firm's global investment banking division.

He is a member of the board of directors of: 
Association of American Colleges and Universities
Eaton Vance Corporation
HealthSouth Corporation

References

"Leo I. Higdon, Jr. - President Emeritus of Connecticut College". Connecticut College official site. Accessed 15 June 2021.
"President Leo Higdon to Retire at the End of 2013". The College Voice - Connecticut College Student Newspaper. Accessed 15 June 2021.
"College bids farewell to President Higdon with fitting tribute". Connecticut College official site. Accessed 15 June 2021.
New York Times (August 27, 2006): Leo Higdon: Back to College After All
"Notable Former Volunteers / Education". Peace Corps official site. Accessed 5 January 2007.

Connecticut College
Georgetown University alumni
Living people
Presidents of the College of Charleston
University of Chicago Booth School of Business alumni
Peace Corps volunteers
Presidents of Babson College
Year of birth missing (living people)